Huyn is a surname. Notable people with the surname include:

 Gottfried Huyn von Geleen (died 1657), Dutch fieldmarshal
 Karl Georg Huyn (1857–1938), Austro-Hungarian colonel general
 Pavel Huyn (1868–1946), Moravian-German Roman Catholic clergyman